Coalition for Melilla (CpM) is a political party in the Spanish city of Melilla.

History
The party was formed shortly before the 1995 municipal regional elections of Melilla, as a split from the Spanish Socialist Workers' Party (PSOE) which had previously a strong electoral implantation among Muslim voters. At the 1995 municipal elections, CpM won five seats, as many as the PSOE, and the People's Party (PP) won 14. Three years later, in August 1998, there was a split in the PP and a new municipal executive was formed against the PP, including the CPM, with its leader Mustafa Aberchán entering it with the Environment portfolio.

In 1999, Mustafa Aberchán, running on the Coalition ticket, became the first Muslim mayor of Melilla with PSOE and Independent Liberal Group (GIL) backing. At the 2007 elections for Melilla Assembly, the party came second (5 seats) after PP (15 seats). CpM was federated on national level with United Left from 2008 to 2013.

Electoral results

Melilla Assembly

Cortes Generales

Sources

Shireen Hunter. Islam, Europe's second religion: the new social, cultural, and political landscape. Greenwood Publishing Group, 2002. , . Pg 173

1995 establishments in Spain
Political parties established in 1995
Political parties in Melilla
Social democratic parties in Spain
United Left (Spain)
Berbers in Spain